is a Japanese musician, who debuted as the lead vocalist and songwriter of the band Queen Bee in 2009, and the band Gokumontō Ikka in 2015. As a producer and songwriter, Avu-chan uses the name , and has written songs for Meg, Rina Satō, Ai Shinozaki, Hey! Say! JUMP and LiSA.

Biography 
Expressing interest in music since middle school and inspired by the Japanese pop/electronic group Perfume, Avu-chan formed the band Queen Bee in 2009 with classmates in Kobe, Hyōgo Prefecture. They started performing at their school's cultural festivals and gained considerable popularity doing so, after which Queen Bee went on to perform at live houses in the Kansai region. The band made their first major concert appearance at the Fuji Rock Festival in July 2010, where they performed as a part of the very selective "Rookie a Go-Go" section, sometimes called the "road to success" for new artists. Having released their debut album Witch Hunt independently in March 2011, the band signed to Sony Music Associated Records, and in September of the same year released their second album Peacock. The band was called the "Japanese Hedwig" during their debut, as the gender identities of the members remain a secret. Not long after signing a contract with Sony Music, Queen Bee found early success with their song "Desco", which was featured in the romantic comedy film Moteki (2011), where the band had also made a cameo.

In 2013, Avu-chan had to pause all band activities, explaining the decision with burnout and technical inexperience. Unsure whether to return home or stay in Tokyo, Avu-chan decided to continue pursuing music after being encouraged by a staff member at Avu-chan's record label, who insisted that Queen Bee's signing was not a fluke. Around this time, Avu-chan asked an acquaintance, a former Blankey Jet City drummer Tatsuya Nakamura, if the two could create something together, to which he immediately agreed and introduced Avu-chan to bassist KenKen of the band Rize. After spending some time in the studio, the three were later joined by guitarist Ryosuke Nagaoka from Tokyo Jihen, whose presence Avu-chan described as "essential", as it gave a sense of unpredictability to the group. The newly formed supergroup, now known as Gokumontō Ikka, made their debut performance at the Rising Sun Rock Festival in August 2013. Only touring and releasing demos online at first, the band then released their first extended play Jitsuroku! Gokumontō Ikka during their November 2015 tour. During the hiatus, Avu-chan also collaborated with singer Mariko Gotō for Pretty Guardian Sailor Moon: The 20th Anniversary Memorial Tribute in 2014, performing a cover of "Ai no Senshi".

Queen Bee reformed in February 2014 after a one-year hiatus. The band's comeback single, "Venus", was used as the theme song for the drama Spooky Romantics (2015), which preceded their fourth album Kirei (2015). In the same year, Avu-chan collaborated with a South Korean boyband Supernova, writing and performing on the leading track "Jesus", from their sub-unit Funky Galaxy's debut extended play. In 2016, Queen Bee and Gokumontō Ikka released a split single, "Kinsei" / "Shibō Yūgi". The packaging for the limited edition of the split single was styled to resemble PlayStation fighting games, with the cover art illustrated by Kinu Nishimura, whose work on the Darkstalkers series has been considered a longtime favorite  by Avu-chan.

In 2017, Avu-chan debuted as a stage actress with a production of The Rocky Horror Show, in the role of Columbia. The production toured Japan in late 2017.

Queen Bee's sixth album Ten (2019) was released to commemorate the band's ten-year anniversary, and was also their first album to ever reach the top 10 on the Oricon charts in Japan. It featured several tracks used as theme songs for anime, such as "Half" in Tokyo Ghoul:re, and "Fire" in Dororo. In 2019, Avu-chan returned to the stage, now in the role of Yitzhak in a Japanese production of Hedwig and the Angry Inch. In late 2020, Avu-chan produced the song "Ōkami Seinen" for an anonymous boyband called Honey Bee, who were later revealed to be Hey! Say! JUMP, and in 2021, collaborated with the singer LiSA on the song "GL", from her 10th anniversary mini-album Ladybug.

In 2022, Avu-chan starred in the Masaaki Yuasa-directed animated film Inu-Oh as the title character.

Personal life 
Avu-chan identifies with gender aspects of both men and women. In school, Avu-chan related to characters who had non-traditional experiences of gender in films, such as Hedwig from Hedwig and the Angry Inch (2001) and the character of Angel in Rent (2005). Avu-chan does not like people who categorize others by gender and racial labels. Avu-chan's official website biography written in 2012 used she/her pronouns, as well as an article with MTV from 2015, however as of 2019 the biography was updated to no longer use pronouns. Often, Japanese language sources will use the Japanese pronoun  (the equivalent of she/her).

Avu-chan based the Queen Bee song "Half" (the ending theme song for the anime Tokyo Ghoul:re (2018)) on childhood experiences in Japan, when people questioned Avu-chan's ethnic background. As a child, Avu-chan wondered why people felt the need to ask about heritage and identity, and did not like the word hāfu ("half" the Japanese term for mixed race children), as Avu-chan did not feel like "half" of something.

Avu-chan's younger sister is Queen Bee drummer Ruri-chan. Avu-chan identifies as a Buddhist.

Discography

Queen Bee

Witch Hunt (2011)
Peacock (2011)
Snake Princess (2012)
Kirei (2015)
Q (2017)
Ten (2019)
BL (2020)

Gokumontō Ikka
Jitsuroku! Gokumontō Ikka (2015)

Guest appearances

Songwriting credits

Bibliography

Filmography

Film

Television

Theater

Web

References

External links 

21st-century Japanese actors
21st-century Japanese singers
Japanese Buddhists
Japanese rock musicians
Japanese singer-songwriters
Japanese musical theatre actors
Japanese music video directors
Japanese LGBT singers
Japanese LGBT songwriters
LGBT Buddhists
Living people
Musicians from Hyōgo Prefecture
Non-binary songwriters
Non-binary singers
Year of birth missing (living people)
21st-century Japanese LGBT people